Karlis Andrejs Ezergailis (born 8 April 1985 in Melbourne, Victoria) is a former motorcycle speedway rider from Australia.

Career
Karlis started out with the Newport Mavericks in 2004 and with good form rode himself into the 2005 Newport Wasps line-up. However Karlis struggled on his home track and returned to Conference League racing. In 2007 he was invited to the Rye House Raiders by promoter Len Silver and his scores steadily improved.

References

1985 births
Living people
Australian speedway riders
Sportspeople from Melbourne
Newport Wasps riders
Rye House Rockets riders